Ceramide synthase 6 is a protein that in humans is encoded by the CERS6 gene.

References

Further reading 

Genes